HuMax is an abbreviation for "human monoclonal antibody targeting...", used by the pharmaceutical company Genmab in trade names. Examples include:

 HuMax-CD4 (zanolimumab)
 HuMax-CD20 (ofatumumab)
 HuMax-EGFr (zalutumumab)

Monoclonal antibodies